Cortaro is a neighborhood of Marana, Arizona in Pima County, Arizona, United States. Cortaro has a post office with ZIP code 85652.

Climate
Climate type is characterized by extremely variable temperature conditions.  The Köppen Climate Classification sub-type for this climate is "Bsh" (Mid-Latitude Steppe and Desert Climate).

References

Unincorporated communities in Pima County, Arizona
Unincorporated communities in Arizona